Nowy Las  is a village in the administrative district of Gmina Jedwabno, within Szczytno County, Warmian-Masurian Voivodeship, northern Poland.

References

Nowy Las